This is a list of Ohio suffragists, suffrage groups and others associated with the cause of women's suffrage in Ohio.

Groups 

 Cincinnati Central Suffrage Committee.
 College Equal Suffrage League.
 Columbus Equal Suffrage League.
 Colored Women's Independent Political League (formerly the Colored Women's Republican Club).
 Cuyahoga County Woman's Suffrage Association (CCWSA), founded in 1910. Later became the Cleveland Woman's Suffrage Party or the Cuyahoga County Woman's Suffrage Party.
 Dayton Woman's Suffrage Association (DWSA) is created around 1869.
 Franklin County Woman Suffrage Association (FCWSA), formed in 1912.
 Hamilton County Suffrage Association.
 Men's Equal Suffrage League, established in Cleveland in 1911.
 Newbury Women's Suffrage Political Club.
 Ohio Men's League for Equal Suffrage, created in February 1912.
 Ohio Woman Suffrage Association (OWSA), founded in 1885 in Painesville.
 Ohio Women's Rights Association (OWRA), first met in Ravenna on May 25, 1853.
 Political Equality Club of Lima.
 Shelby Equal Franchise Association, formed in 1912.
 Sojourner Truth Women's Suffrage Association (STWSA).
 Suffrage Association of Warren.
 Suffrage Party of Lakewood.
 Toledo Women's Suffrage Association (TWSA) is founded in 1869.
Woman Suffrage Party of Cleveland.
 Woman's Suffrage Association of Dayton and Montgomery County, formed in 1912.
 Woman's Suffrage Association of Richland County.

Suffragists 

Florence E. Allen (Cleveland).
Dora Bachman (Cincinnati).
Elizabeth Bisbee (Columbus).
Ella Reeve Bloor (Columbus).
Minerva Brooks (Cleveland).
Hallie Quinn Brown (Wilberforce).
Frances M. Casement.
Katharine Benedicta Trotter Claypole (Akron).
Carrie Williams Clifford (Cleveland).
Harris R. Cooley (Cleveland).
Elizabeth Greer Coit (Columbus).
Olive Colton (Toledo).
Hannah Cutler.
Eliza Archard Conner (New Richmond).
Anna Julia Cooper (Xenia).
Betsy Mix Cowles (Ashtabula County).
Bessie Crayton (Lima).
Hannah Cutler.
Jesse Davisson (Dayton).
Edward A. Deeds (Dayton).
 Mary Douglas (Cincinnati).
Dora Easton (Cincinnati).
Louise Eastman (Cincinnati).
Martha H. Elwell.
Caroline McCullough Everhard (Massillon).
Sara Evan Fletcher
Ellen Sulley Fray.
Trixie Friganza (Cincinnati).
Frances Dana Gage.
Edith J. Goode (Springfield).
Josephine S. Griffing (Salem).
Mary Belle Grossman (Cleveland).
Laura C. Haeckl (Cincinnati).
Elizabeth Hauser (Cleveland).
 Jewelila Higgins (Dayton).
 Josephine Saxer Irwin (Cuyahoga County).
 Rachel S. A. Janney.
Jane Hitchcock Jones.
Harriet Keeler (Cleveland).
Belle Coit Kelton (Columbus).
 Betsey Lewis (Warren).
 Mary MacMillan (Cincinnati).
Helen Wise Mallony (Cincinnati).
Lizzie Marvin (Shelby).
Lucia McCurdy McBride (Cleveland).
Dorothy Mead.
Marguerite Molliter (Cincinnati).
Henrietta G. Moore (Springfield).
 John Moore (president of the United Mine Workers of Ohio).
Rosa Moorman.
John H. Patterson (Dayton).
Emma Maud Perkins (Cleveland).
Edna Brush Perkins (Cleveland).
Sarah Maria Clinton Perkins (Cleveland).
Laura Proctor (Cincinnati).
Bernice Pyke (Lakewood).
Kenyon Hayden Rector (Columbus).
Nellie Robinson (Cincinnati).
Viola D. Romans (Cincinnati).
Sarah C. Schrader.
Rosa L. Segur (Toledo).
Caroline Severance.
Lydia DeVilbiss Shauk (Shelby).
Belle Sherwin (Cleveland).
Sarah Siewers (Cincinnati).
Ida Ricketts Snell (Cincinnati).
Louise Southgate (Cincinnati).
Louisa Southworth (Cleveland).
Doris Stevens (Dayton).
Pauline Perlmutter Steinem (Toledo).
Charles F. Thwing (Cleveland).
Harriet Taylor Upton (Warren).
Maude Edith Comstock Waitt (Lakewood).
Myron B. Vorce (Cleveland).
Alma Kephart Wilson (Cincinnati).
Bettie Wilson (Cincinnati).
Peter Witt (Cleveland).
Clara Snell Wolfe.
Victoria Claflin Woodhull (Massillon).
Katharine Wright (Dayton).
Orville Wright (Dayton).
Mary Yeager (Cincinnati).

Politicians supporting women's suffrage 

 Roland W. Baggott.
 Newton D. Baker (Cleveland).
 Ellsworth R. Bathrick (Akron).
 James M. Cox (Dayton).
 Joshua Giddings (Ashtabula County).
Tom L. Johnson (Cleveland).
 William McKinley.
 Jacob Henry Miller.
 James A. Reynolds (Cuyahoga County).
 Ezra B. Taylor (Warren).
 Benjamin Wade (Ashtabula County).
 Brand Whitlock (Toledo).

Places 

 Harriet Taylor Upton House (Warren).

Publications 

 The Alliance.
 Everywoman.
 The Ohio Woman.

Suffragists who campaigned in Ohio 

Jane Addams.
Susan B. Anthony.
Antoinette Brown Blackwell.
Carrie Chapman Catt.
Margaret Foley.
 Elizabeth Freeman.
Laura A. Gregg.
Louise Hall.
Julia Ward Howe.
 Rosalie G. Jones.
Elizabeth A. Kingsbury.
Emmeline Pankhurst.
Sylvia Pankhurst.
Maud Wood Park.
Emily Pierson.
Jeannette Rankin.
Rose Schneiderman.
Anna Howard Shaw.
 Florence Sherwood, president of the Wage Earners' Suffrage League of Chicago.
Elizabeth Cady Stanton.
Lucy Stone.
Jane Thompson.
George Francis Train.
Sojourner Truth.
Camillo von Klenze.
Zerelda G. Wallace.
Bettina Borrmann Wells.

Anti-suffrage 
Groups

 Cincinnati and Hamilton County Association Opposed to Woman Suffrage.
 Ohio Women's Anti-Suffrage League.

Anti-suffragists
 Mrs. Herman Hubbard (Columbus).
 Ruby Osborne (Cincinnati).
 Lucy Price.
 Maria Longworth Storer (Cincinnati).
 Katherine Talbott (Dayton).

See also 

 Timeline of women's suffrage in Ohio
 Women's suffrage in Ohio
 Women's suffrage in states of the United States
 Women's suffrage in the United States

References

Sources 

 
 
 

 
 
 
 

Ohio suffrage

Ohio suffragists
Activists from Ohio
History of Ohio
suffragists